Doddridge County Schools is the operating school district within Doddridge County, West Virginia. It is governed by the Doddridge County Board of Education.

Schools

High schools
Doddridge County High School

Middle schools
Doddridge County Middle School

Elementary schools
Doddridge County Elementary School

External links
Doddridge County Schools

School districts in West Virginia
Education in Doddridge County, West Virginia